Heasley is a surname. Notable people with the surname include:

 Derek Heasley (born 1972), Irish cricket player
 Jonathan Heasley (born 1997), American baseball player
 Marla Heasley (born 1959), American film and TV actress
 Tom Heasley, American musician

See also
 14564 Heasley, main-belt asteroid
 Healey (surname)